Zadick is a surname. Notable people with the surname include:

Bill Zadick (born 1973), American wrestler 
Mike Zadick (born 1978), American wrestler, brother of Bill